Richard Allan Crunkilton Jr (born November 25, 1979) is an American mixed martial artist. Crunkilton is perhaps best known for his 8–2 stint with the World Extreme Cagefighting promotion. He currently competes in the Lightweight division.

Early career
Crunkilton made his professional MMA debut in October 1999, defeating Ray Totorico via TKO. Following this, Crunkilton would compile a record of 8-0 before signing with the World Extreme Cagefighting promotion in 2002.

World Extreme Cagefighting

Crunkilton made his debut on June 7, 2002, at WEC 3, defeating Cruz Gomez via first-round TKO. He then made a quick turnaround and faced Luciano Oliveira at WEC 4 on August 31, 2002. He won the fight via armbar submission.

Crunkilton then defeated Victor Estrada at WEC 5: Halloween Havoc on October 18, 2002, due to an ankle injury.

Ultimate Fighting Championship
With an impressive undefeated record of 11–0, Crunkilton signed with the UFC and faced Hermes França at UFC 42 on April 25, 2003. Though Crunkilton was the moderate favorite coming into the fight, he would lose the fight via unanimous decision and was subsequently released shortly after.

Return to WEC

Following a short stint in the UFC, Crunkilton returned at WEC 15 on May 19, 2005, defeating Paul Jenkins via KO. He faced Nick Ertl at WEC 18: Unfinished Business on January 13, 2006. He won the fight via TKO, advancing his WEC to 5–0.

He then faced Adam Lynn at WEC 21 on June 15, 2006. He won the fight via rear-naked choke. Crunkilton won his next fight against Mike Joy at WEC 25 on January 20, 2007, via D'arce choke.

Crunkilton lost his first fight in the WEC on September 5, 2007, when he lost to Rob McCullough via TKO for the WEC Lightweight Championship at WEC 30.

He defeated Sergio Gomez on March 26, 2008, at WEC 33.  He was scheduled to face Donald Cerrone at WEC 34, but was forced off the card with an injury.  Crunkilton was forced to withdraw from his bout with Bart Palaszewski at WEC 39 because of a knee injury.  He was again scheduled to fight Donald Cerrone on June 7, 2009, at WEC 41, but dropped out due to another undisclosed injury.

Crunkilton made his return from injury at WEC 43 where he lost by decision to WEC newcomer Dave Jansen.

Shortly after his defeat at WEC 43, Crunkilton was released from the promotion.

Post-WEC
In his first fight since leaving the WEC, Crunkilton faced UFC veteran Carlo Prater at the Shine: Lightweight Grand Prix on September 10, 2010. He won the fight via split decision. After a three-year hiatus, Crunkilton returned to MMA and faced Akhmet Aliev at Fight Nights: Battle of Moscow 14 on December 7, 2013. Crunkilton lost the fight via KO.

Mixed martial arts record

|-
| Loss
| align=center| 19–4
| Akhmet Aliev
| KO (punch)
| Fight Nights - Battle of Moscow 14
| 
| align=center| 1
| align=center| 1:15
| Moscow, Russia
|
|-
| Win
| align=center| 19–3
| Carlo Prater
| Decision (split)
| Shine: Lightweight Grand Prix
| 
| align=center| 3
| align=center| 5:00
| Newkirk, Oklahoma, United States
| 
|-
| Loss
| align=center| 18–3
| Dave Jansen
| Decision (unanimous)
| WEC 43
| 
| align=center| 3
| align=center| 5:00
| San Antonio, Texas, United States
| 
|-
| Win
| align=center| 18–2
| Sergio Gomez
| Decision (unanimous)
| WEC 33: Marshall vs. Stann
| 
| align=center| 3
| align=center| 5:00
| Las Vegas, Nevada, United States
| 
|-
| Loss
| align=center| 17–2
| Rob McCullough
| TKO (punches)
| WEC 30
| 
| align=center| 1
| align=center| 1:29
| Las Vegas, Nevada, United States
| 
|-
| Win
| align=center| 17–1
| Mike Joy
| Submission (D'arce choke)
| WEC 25
| 
| align=center| 3
| align=center| 4:23
| Las Vegas, Nevada, United States
| 
|-
| Win
| align=center| 16–1
| Adam Lynn
| Submission (rear-naked choke)
| WEC 21: Tapout
| 
| align=center| 2
| align=center| 1:20
| Highland, California, United States
| 
|-
| Win
| align=center| 15–1
| Nick Ertl
| TKO (punches)
| WEC 18: Unfinished Business
| 
| align=center| 2
| align=center| 3:55
| Lemoore, California, United States
| 
|-
| Win
| align=center| 14–1
| James Martinez
| TKO (punches)
| Freedom Fight - Canada vs USA
| 
| align=center| 1
| align=center| 3:31
| Quebec, Canada
| 
|-
| Win
| align=center| 13–1
| Paul Jenkins
| KO (punches)
| WEC 15
| 
| align=center| 2
| align=center| 2:36
| Lemoore, California, United States
| 
|-
| Win
| align=center| 12–1
| Peter Kaljevic
| Submission (armbar)
| Real Fighting Championships 1
| 
| align=center| 1
| align=center| 3:44
| Tampa, Florida, United States
| 
|-
| Loss
| align=center| 11–1
| Hermes França
| Decision (unanimous)
| UFC 42
| 
| align=center| 3
| align=center| 5:00
| Miami, Florida, United States
| 
|-
| Win
| align=center| 11–0
| Víctor Estrada
| Submission (ankle injury)
| WEC 5: Halloween Havoc
| 
| align=center| 1
| align=center| 1:13
| Lemoore, California, United States
| 
|-
| Win
| align=center| 10–0
| Luciano Oliveira
| Submission (armbar)
| WEC 4
| 
| align=center| 1
| align=center| 1:55
| Uncasville, Connecticut, United States
| 
|-
| Win
| align=center| 9–0
| Cruz Gomez
| TKO (punches)
| WEC 3
| 
| align=center| 1
| align=center| 3:04
| Lemoore, California, United States
| 
|-
| Win
| align=center| 8–0
| Bao Quach
| KO (punches)
| UA 2 - The Gathering
| 
| align=center| 2
| align=center| 1:20
| Cabazon, California, United States
| 
|-
| Win
| align=center| 7–0
| Aaron Jerome
| TKO (punches)
| RITR - Rumble in the Rockies
| 
| align=center| 1
| align=center| 1:00
| Denver, Colorado, United States
| 
|-
| Win
| align=center| 6–0
| Eric Hibler
| Decision
| RSF 1 - Redemption in the Valley
| 
| align=center| 3
| align=center| 4:00
| Wheeling, West Virginia, United States
|
|-
| Win
| align=center| 5–0
| Zviad Abuseridze
| Submission (triangle choke)
| WEF - World Extreme Fighting: Rumble at the Rodeo 2
| 
| align=center| 2
| align=center| 1:17
| Kissimmee, Florida, United States
|
|- 
| Win
| align=center| 4–0
| Leonard Speights
| KO (punches)
| WEF - World Extreme Fighting: Rumble at the Rodeo 1
| 
| align=center| 1
| align=center| N/A
| United States
|
|-
| Win
| align=center| 3–0
| Scott Johnson
| Submission (kneebar)
| WVF - Battlejax
| 
| align=center| 1
| align=center| 5:19
| Jacksonville, Florida, United States
| 
|-
| Win
| align=center| 2–0
| Robert Irizarry
| Decision (unanimous)
| WEF - New Blood Conflict
| 
| align=center| 3
| align=center| 3:00
| United States
| 
|-
| Win
| align=center| 1–0
| Ray Totorico
| TKO (punches)
| WEF 7 - Stomp in the Swamp
| 
| align=center| 2
| align=center| 2:24
| Kenner, Louisiana, United States
|

References

External links

Official UFC Profile for Richard Crunkilton

1979 births
Living people
American male mixed martial artists
Mixed martial artists from Florida
Lightweight mixed martial artists
Mixed martial artists utilizing judo
Mixed martial artists utilizing Brazilian jiu-jitsu
American practitioners of Brazilian jiu-jitsu
People awarded a black belt in Brazilian jiu-jitsu
American male judoka
Ultimate Fighting Championship male fighters